The 8th Canadian Parliament was in session from August 19, 1896, until October 9, 1900. The membership was set by the 1896 federal election on June 23, 1896. It was dissolved prior to the 1900 election.

It was controlled by a Liberal Party majority under Prime Minister Sir Wilfrid Laurier and the 8th Canadian Ministry. The Official Opposition was the Conservative/Liberal-Conservative, led by Charles Tupper.

The Speaker was first James David Edgar, and later Thomas Bain. See also List of Canadian electoral districts 1892-1903 for a list of the ridings in this parliament.

There were five sessions of the 8th Parliament:

List of members 

Following is a full list of members of the eighth Parliament listed first by province, then by electoral district.

Electoral districts denoted by an asterisk (*) indicates that district was represented by two members.

British Columbia

Manitoba

New Brunswick

Northwest Territories

Nova Scotia

Ontario

Prince Edward Island

Quebec

By-elections

References 

1896 establishments in Canada
1900 disestablishments in Canada
1896 in Canada
1897 in Canada
1898 in Canada
1899 in Canada
1900 in Canada
08th Canadian parliament